Tulipa sylvestris, the wild tulip or  woodland tulip, is a Eurasian and North African species of wild tulip, a plant in the lily family. Its native range extends from Portugal and Morocco to western China, covering most of the Mediterranean and Black Sea Basins, and Central Asia. The species is also cultivated as an ornamental and naturalized in central and northern Europe as well as a few scattered locations in North America. 
It was first recorded as being naturalised in Britain in the late 17th century.

Description
It is a bulb-forming perennial, with narrow blue-grey leaves and usually with 1 or 2 flowers per stem. The stem can reach up to 50cm tall. The scented blooms appear between April and May, and the yellow flowers are sometimes tinged red on the outside.

They rarely produce seed and are pollinated by small insects.

Subspecies
 Tulipa sylvestris subsp. australis (Link) Pamp - from Portugal + Morocco to Xinjiang
 Tulipa sylvestris subsp. primulina (Baker) Maire & Weiller -  Algeria, Morocco
 Tulipa sylvestris subsp. sylvestris - Italy, Libya

Tulipa australis is also found on the island of Malta, in the Mediterranean Sea, limited to one specific area.

Habitat
It is found in dry grassy places and in woodland copses.

References

External links
Plants For a Future, Tulipa sylvestris - L.
Dave's Garden Plantfiles, Florentine Tulip, Wild Tulip Tulipa sylvestris
Pacific Bulb Society, Tulipa Species Four photos of several species
Care For Tulips Plant
Great Plant Picks

sylvestris
Flora of Asia
Garden plants
Plants described in 1753
Taxa named by Carl Linnaeus